Marcos Antunes Trigueiro, known as the Industrial Maniac and the Contagem Maniac (born in Brasília de Minas, Minas Gerais on May 29, 1978) is a former Brazilian driver accused of being a serial killer of women who operated in the Contagem and Belo Horizonte cities. Trigueiro raped and murdered five women between April 17, 2009 and February 26, 2010, when he was detained by Minas Gerais Civil Police in the Lindeia neighbourhood, near the industrial district in Contagem. Police officers discovered that he tracked down the victims' cell phones, with Trigueiro himself confessing to the murders after his arrest. Delegate Edson Moreira, one of those responsible for the case, announced on February 26 that at least three women were able to escape the maniac.

On February 2, 2010, police had disclosed that there was a common behavioural pattern in all the murders, and that an expert found semen in the three 2009 victims which was from the same perpetrator.

The case recalls another similar murder spree in Belo Horizonte between 1999 and 2001, when twelve women were found raped and killed in Greater Belo Horizonte, called the UFMG Maniac or the Maniac da Pampulha, who was never apprehended.

Biography 
Marcos Antunes Trigueiro was born in Brasília de Minas, Minas Gerais, but spent a part of his life in São Paulo and Rio de Janeiro, but always returned to Minas Gerais. Trigueiro has been married at least twice and is the father of five children.

Victims 
 Ana Carolina Menezes Assunção, a 27-year old merchant, was found strangled inside her car in the neighbourhood of João Pinheiro, Northwestern region, on April 17, 2009. Her son, a baby of only fourteen months, was in the vehicle and was found sleeping on his mother's body unharmed. Carolina was strangled with a tennis shoelace.
 Maria Helena Lopes Aguilar, 49, was found strangled in her car in Rua das Trombetas, Cojunto California, Northwestern region, on September 17, 2009. Helena was strangled with a seat belt at the bank, behind the car.
 Edna Cordeiro de Oliveira Freitas, a 35-year old accountant, was found dead on a dirt road linking the Jardim Canadá neighbourhood in Nova Lima to BR-040 on November 12, 2009. Her car was found the previous day in the industrial district in Contagem with all her belongings except her cell phone. Cordeira was strangled with the necklace she wore.
 Adina Feitor Porto, a 27-year old law student, disappeared on January 7, 2010, after leaving her home in the Santa Margarida neighbourhood to leave for college. Her car was found in Barreiro de Baixo the following day.
 Natália Cristina de Almeida Paiva, a 27-year old merchant, disappeared on October 7, 2010 in the Lindeia neighbourhood. Her body was found 22 days later, in a forest in the region of Ribeirão das Neves, but was buried as an indigent. Only four months later, the family recognized Natália's clothes, her body was exhumed and the victim was identified.

See also 
The Lisbon Ripper
List of fugitives from justice who disappeared
List of serial killers by country

References

«Latrocínio em Contagem pode aumentar ficha criminal de Marcos Antunes Trigueiro». Globominas.globo.com. 1 de março de 2010. Consultado em 2 de março de 2010.

Parreiras, Mateus (2 de fevereiro de 2010). «Polícia já tem pistas sobre o maníaco sexual que ataca mulheres na Grande BH». Hojeemdia.com.br. Consultado em 2 de março de 2010. Cópia arquivada em 5 de fevereiro de 2010.

«Contribuição União Brasileira de Mulheres - UBM/MG» (PDF). Comissão Parlamentar Mista de Inquérito para Investigar Situações de Violência Contra a Mulher no Brasil. Senado.gov.br. 26 de abril de 2012. Consultado em 20 de maio de 2013.

1978 births
Brazilian rapists
Brazilian serial killers
Fugitives
Living people
Male serial killers